Irañeta is a town and municipality located in the province and autonomous community of Navarre, northern Spain. It is located 195 miles North-East of Spain's capital city, Madrid. Its current population as of 2017 is a 174.

References

External links
 IRAÑETA in the Bernardo Estornés Lasa - Auñamendi Encyclopedia (Euskomedia Fundazioa) 
http://www.citypopulation.info/php/spain-navarra.php?cityid=31127

Municipalities in Navarre